Greigia ocellata is a plant species in the genus Greigia. It is also perennial.

This species is native to Venezuela and Colombia. It is listed as critically endangered by the IUCN.

References

Sources

ocellata
Flora of Venezuela